The 2006–07 season of the NOFV-Oberliga was the thirteenth season of the league at tier four (IV) of the German football league system.

The NOFV-Oberliga was split into two divisions, NOFV-Oberliga Nord and NOFV-Oberliga Süd. The champions of each, SV Babelsberg 03 and FC Energie Cottbus II, were directly promoted to the 2007–08 Regionalliga Nord.

North

Top goalscorers

South

Top goalscorers

External links 
 NOFV-Online – official website of the North-East German Football Association 

NOFV-Oberliga seasons
4
Germ